Zarchi may refer to:
Zarchi, Iran, a village in Kerman Province, Iran
Meir Zarchi (b. 1937), Israeli film director
Nurit Zarchi (b. 1941), Israeli poet and author